Open access to scholarly communication in South Africa occurs online via journals, repositories, and a variety of other tools and platforms. Compared to other African nations, open access in South Africa has grown quickly in recent years.

According to UNESCO, South Africa is a leading African country in terms of open access policies on the governmental level and grass-roots initiatives in universities and research organizations. South African signatories to the international "Open Access 2020" campaign, launched in 2016, include the South African National Library and Information Consortium (SANLiC) and University of the Witwatersrand, Johannesburg. As of January 2018, there are nine research entities with policies in the international Registry of Open Access Repository Mandates and Policies.

Journals
As of April 2018, the international Directory of Open Access Journals records some 79 open access journals produced in South Africa.

Repositories
As of July 2018, the Directory of Open Access Repositories lists 39 repositories in South Africa. This includes 11 traditional universities (or at least their departments), several universities of technology (Cape Peninsula University of Technology, Durban University of Technology, Central University of Technology and Tshwane University of Technology), three comprehensive universities (University of Johannesburg, University of South Africa and University of Zululand) and Council for Scientific and Industrial Research (CSIR).

See also
 African Journals OnLine
 Access to information in South Africa
 Science and technology in South Africa
 List of archives in South Africa
 Open access in other countries

Sources

References

Further reading

External links

Open Access Week 2013 at the University of Cape Town
  Held at Stellenbosch University, South Africa, November 7–8, 2012.
 CSIR Research Space provides access to some of the research outputs generated by CSIR scientists.
 Rhodes Digital Commons provides access to some of the research output generated by the Rhodes University community.
 SUNScholar provides access to research output from Stellenbosch University.
 UPSpace provides access to some of the research outputs generated by researchers at the University of Pretoria.
 UWC Theses Online The University of the Western Cape electronic theses and dissertations repository holds full-text theses submitted for degree purposes since 2004, with selected titles prior to 2004.
 Boloka provides access to some of the research outputs generated by researchers at the North-West University.
http://wiki.lib.sun.ac.za/index.php/SUNScholar/Ranking/National
 
 
OpenUCT provides access to full-text electronic theses and dissertations submitted for degree purposes at University of Cape Town
ZivaHub: Open Data UCT provides open access to research data generated at University of Cape Town

Academia in South Africa
South Africa
Science and technology in South Africa